Sandra Jane Hairston (born 1958) is an American lawyer who has served as the United States Attorney for the Middle District of North Carolina since 2021.

Education

Hairston received her Bachelor of Arts from the University of North Carolina at Charlotte in 1981 and her Juris Doctor from North Carolina Central University School of Law in 1987.

Career

Hairston previously served as an assistant district attorney in Columbus County, North Carolina, from 1987 to 1989 and as a special assistant district attorney in Guilford County, North Carolina from 1989 to 1990. From 1994 to 1996, she served as chief of the criminal division of the United States Attorney's office for the Eastern District of North Carolina before returning to the Middle District of North Carolina in 1996. She joined the United States Attorney's office for the Middle District of North Carolina in 1990 as an Assistant United States Attorney. Hairston previously held the position of First Assistant United States Attorney for the Middle District of North Carolina from 2014 to 2021. From March 1, 2021, until her Senate confirmation in November 2021, she served as the acting United States Attorney for the Middle District of North Carolina.

U.S. Attorney for the Middle District of North Carolina

Acting U.S. attorney 
She served as acting U.S. Attorney from January 14, 2017, to January 3, 2018. and again from March 1 to November 19, 2021.

U.S. attorney nomination 
On September 28, 2021, President Joe Biden nominated Hairston to be the United States Attorney for the Middle District of North Carolina. On October 28, 2021, her nomination was favorably reported out of committee by a voice vote. On November 19, 2021, her nomination was confirmed in the United States Senate by voice vote. She was sworn into office on November 23, 2021, by Chief Judge Thomas D. Schroeder.

References

External links
 Biography at U.S. Department of Justice

|-

1958 births
Living people
21st-century American women lawyers
21st-century American lawyers
African-American lawyers
Assistant United States Attorneys
North Carolina Central University alumni
People from Stokes County, North Carolina
United States Attorneys for the Middle District of North Carolina
University of North Carolina at Charlotte alumni